Silverwood Colliery F.C. was an English association football club based in Rotherham, South Yorkshire.

History
They competed in the Midland Football League in 1919–20, and in the FA Cup on numerous occasions.

League and cup history

Records
 Furthest FA Cup run – 3rd qualifying round, 1913–14, 1933–34

References

Defunct football clubs in South Yorkshire
Defunct football clubs in England
Sheffield Association League
Midland Football League (1889)
Mining association football teams in England